Teilma may refer to several places in Estonia:

Teilma, Jõgeva County, village in Jõgeva Parish, Jõgeva County
Teilma, Tartu County, village in Puhja Parish, Tartu County